The , meaning "Aviation Square", is a square located in the Brussels municipality of Anderlecht, Belgium. The Centre for Historical Research and Documentation on War and Contemporary Society (Cegesoma or CegeSoma) is located on this square.

The Square de l'Aviation is bounded to the east by the / and extended, to the west, by the / on the odd side and the / on the even side. The angle of the two streets forms a cutaway. This area is served by Brussels-South railway station.

History
The Square de l'Aviation was created by virtue of a royal decree issued on 19 October 1909, on the site of the former Royal School of Veterinary Medicine (now moved to Liège). The school's former site, relocated to the /, was acquired in 1892 by the municipality of Anderlecht, which drew up development plans for it from 1895. These plans consisted of a square open to the Small Ring (Brussels' inner ring road), from which two  diagonal streets began, creating a triangular island with the /.

Prizes were planned for the most beautiful facades that would be erected within six years on land sold by the municipality in the district of the former Veterinary School. In practice, however, only part of the plots were built before the First World War. The new arteries were lined with tall and often wide buildings, mostly housing shops on the ground floor and housing on the upper floors. Now called Le Triangle, the district is largely occupied by companies active in the clothing industry.

The square consists of four to six-storey buildings. The first ones were designed, between 1910 and 1913, in eclectic and Beaux-Arts styles. In 1911, the La Prévoyance Sociale building was established in the axis of the square. In the 1920s, the plots that had remained untouched were filled with buildings most often in the Beaux-Arts style tinged with Art Deco. Several buildings were converted into a hotel in the 2000s.

From the outset, the square was embellished with a triangular parterre on the boulevard's side, which in 1924 welcomed the Monument to the Showmen who died for the Fatherland. In 2005–06, the space was redesigned as a pedestrian area, with the exception of the western end, where a carriageway connects the Rue Lambert Crickx and the Rue de l'Autonomie. The narrow part of the square now houses a fountain.

Notable buildings
The Square de l'Aviation is home to an important architectural heritage:
It is now home to the Centre for Historical Research and Documentation on War and Contemporary Society (Cegesoma or CegeSoma), a historical research institute and archive focussing on the Second World War and the contemporary history of Belgium
In 2003, the monument, in poor condition, was restored and the white marble statue replaced by a copy. The restored original is now in the Municipal Hall.
 No. 23–27: Hotel resulting from the transformation, in the 2000s, of two buildings erected in 1913: a Beaux-Arts style house designed (no. 23) and an eclectic apartment building with Art Nouveau accents (no. 25–27)

See also

 Art Nouveau in Brussels
 Art Deco in Brussels
 History of Brussels
 Belgium in "the long nineteenth century"

References

Notes

Squares in Brussels
Anderlecht
Protected heritage sites in Brussels